Opishnia is an urban-type settlement in Poltava Raion of Poltava Oblast in Ukraine. It is located on the right bank of the Vorskla, a tributary of the Dnieper. Opishnia hosts the administration of Opishnia settlement hromada, one of the hromadas of Ukraine. Population: 

Until 18 July 2020, Opishnia belonged to Zinkiv Raion. The raion was abolished in July 2020 as part of the administrative reform of Ukraine, which reduced the number of raions of Poltava Oblast to four. The area of Zinkiv Raion was merged into Poltava Raion.

Economy

Transportation

The settlement has access to highway H12 connecting Poltava and Sumy. It is also connected by road to Lubny via Myrhorod.

References

Urban-type settlements in Poltava Raion
Zenkovsky Uyezd